nferNelson is the former name of GL Assessment, a leading independent provider of tests and other assessment services for education in the United Kingdom. Their products, which include assessments for the 0–19 age group, have a national reputation.

nferNelson were founded by the National Foundation for Educational Research (NFER), and became part of the Granada Learning Group in 2000.

In December 2007 NFER-Nelson's name was formally changed to GL Assessment

References

External links
GL Assessment Homepage

Education in Swindon
Educational testing and assessment organizations
Educational organisations based in England
Organisations based in Swindon